Pitha Haningtyas Mentari (born 1 July 1999) is an Indonesian badminton player from Jaya Raya Jakarta badminton club. She won the gold medal at the 2017 World Junior Championships, and bronze medals at the 2019 and 2021 Southeast Asian Games in the mixed doubles with Rinov Rivaldy. Mentari was also a member of the Indonesian women's team that won the silver medal in 2019 and 2021 Southeast Asian Games.

Career

2023 
In January, Mentari and Rinov Rivaldy started 2023 BWF World Tour by losing in the first round of Malaysia Open from 8th seed Thom Gicquel and Delphine Delrue of France. In the next week, they also lost the first round of India Open from 4th seed Wang Yilyu and Huang Dongping of China. They competed in the home tournament, Indonesia Masters, but unfortunately lost in the second round from unseeded Chinese pair Feng Yanzhe and Huang Dongping.

In February, Mentari join the Indonesia national badminton team to compete at the Badminton Asia Mixed Team Championships, but unfortunately the teams lost in the quarter-finals from team Korea.

Achievements

Southeast Asian Games 
Mixed doubles

BWF World Junior Championships 
Mixed doubles

BWF World Tour (2 titles, 3 runners-up) 
The BWF World Tour, which was announced on 19 March 2017 and implemented in 2018, is a series of elite badminton tournaments sanctioned by the Badminton World Federation (BWF). The BWF World Tour is divided into levels of World Tour Finals, Super 1000, Super 750, Super 500, Super 300, and the BWF Tour Super 100.

Mixed doubles

BWF Junior International (2 titles, 1 runner-up) 
Girls' doubles

Mixed doubles

  BWF Junior International Grand Prix tournament
  BWF Junior International Challenge tournament
  BWF Junior International Series tournament
  BWF Junior Future Series tournament

Performance timeline

National team 
 Senior level

Individual competitions

Junior level  
 Girls' doubles

 Mixed doubles

Senior level

Women's doubles

Mixed doubles

References

External links 
 

1999 births
Living people
Sportspeople from Jakarta
Indonesian female badminton players
Competitors at the 2019 Southeast Asian Games
Competitors at the 2021 Southeast Asian Games
Southeast Asian Games silver medalists for Indonesia
Southeast Asian Games bronze medalists for Indonesia
Southeast Asian Games medalists in badminton
21st-century Indonesian women
20th-century Indonesian women